The president of the West Virginia Senate is a member of the West Virginia Senate who has been elected to be its president by the other senators. The current Senate president is Craig Blair, who has been in office since January 2021.

In addition to serving as the Senate's presiding officer, the Senate President is also first in the line of succession to the office of governor of West Virginia (the Senate president does not succeed to that office, but rather assumes that office's powers and duties as acting governor, with the governorship remaining vacant). As stated in Article 7, Section 16 of the West Virginia Constitution: "In case of the death, conviction or impeachment, failure to qualify, resignation, or other disability of the governor, the president of the Senate shall act as governor until the vacancy is filled, or the disability removed." However, the Senate President may not always serve that role for the whole remainder of the gubernatorial term, as the constitution also states: "Whenever a vacancy shall occur in the office of governor before the first three years of the term shall have expired, a new election for governor shall take place to fill the vacancy."

The West Virginia Constitution does not create or even mention the title of lieutenant governor. However, in 2000, the West Virginia Legislature adopted West Virginia Code chapter 6A, section 1-4(b), which says "the president of the Senate shall be additionally designated the title of lieutenant governor". Earl Ray Tomblin was the first Senate president to thus have the title lieutenant governor of West Virginia.

List
The presidents of the West Virginia Senate since 1863:

References

See also
West Virginia Senate
List of current United States lieutenant governors

 

Government of West Virginia
Politics of West Virginia